Handball Club Toronto  is a handball club from Toronto, Ontario, Canada. At the time of their creation, they were the only active handball organization in the Greater Toronto Area. There are senior teams for all genders and every skill level.
HC Toronto is listed under the Top 25 USA Team Handball Clubs in the 2018–19 USA Team Handball rankings.
As a member of Canadian Team Handball Federation and International Handball Federation. Handball Club Toronto is competing in the Canadian and American Team Handball Nationals.

Accomplishments

Staff and Management

References

External links

Sport in Toronto
Handball in Canada
Women's handball in Canada
Pan-American Team Handball Federation
Sports organizations established in 2018